That's My Gal is a 1947 American comedy film directed by George Blair, written by Joseph Hoffman, and starring Lynne Roberts, Don "Red" Barry, Pinky Lee, Frank Jenks, Edward Gargan and Judy Clark. It was released on May 15, 1947, by Republic Pictures.

Plot

Cast 
  
Lynne Roberts as Natalie Adams
Don "Red" Barry as Benny Novak 
Pinky Lee as Harry Coleman
Frank Jenks as Louie Koblentz
Edward Gargan as Mike
Judy Clark as Helen McBride
Paul Stanton as Governor Thompson
John Hamilton as Assemblyman McBride
Ray Walker as Danny Malone
Marion Martin as Pepper
Elmer Jerome as Joshua Perkins
George M. Carleton as Judge 
St. Clair and Vilvoa as Dance Team
The Guadalajara Trio as Singers
Lita Baron as Isabelita 
Jan Savitt as Orchestra Leader

References

External links 
 

1947 films
American comedy films
1947 comedy films
Republic Pictures films
Films directed by George Blair
1940s English-language films
1940s American films